Longshan (Chinese: trad. , simp. , Lóngshān, lit. "Dragon Mountain") may refer to a number of places in mainland China and Taiwan. It may also infrequently refer to another Mount Long (t , s , Lǒngshān) which is used as an abbreviation for Gansu. Both may also be referred to by the former romanization Lung-shan.

Counties
 Longshan County in Xiangxi, Hunan

Districts
 Longshan District in Liaoyuan, Jilin

Towns 

 Longshan Town in Zhangjiachuan Hui Autonomous County, Gansu
 Longshan Town in Youyi County, Heilongjiang
 Longshan Town in Cixi, Zhejiang
 Longshan Town in Longkang, Anhui
 Longshan Town in Guoyang County, Anhui
 Longshan Town in Nanjing County, Fujian
 Longshan Town in Ju County, Shandong
 Longshan Town in Fogang County, Guangdong
 Longshan Town in Gulin County, Sichuan
 Longshan Town in Cangxi County, Sichuan
 Longshan Town in Zizhong County, Sichuan
 Longshan Town in Anlong County, Guizhou
 Longshan Town in Longli County, Guizhou
 Longshan Town in Majiang County, Guizhou
 Longshan Town in Longling County, Yunnan
Other
 Longshan Temple (disambiguation), the name of five temples in Taiwan
 Longshan culture, a late Neolithic culture located on the central and lower reaches of the Yellow River

See also
 Longjiang in Shunde District, Foshan, in Guangdong (formerly named Longshan)
 Long Sơn (disambiguation) (Vietnamese pronunciation of the same "龍山")
 Yongsan (Korean pronunciation of the same "龍山")